The NorthStandard P&I Association or Club is a marine mutual liability insurer in the United Kingdom.

In May 2022, it was announced that the North of England P&I Association would merge with the Standard Steamship Owners Protection & Indemnity Association (the Standard Club). The merger took place during Q1, 2023. The new Association is known as the NorthStandard P&I Association.

The P&I Club provides protecting and indemnity (P&I), freight demurrage and defence (FD&D), war risks and ancillary insurance cover and loss prevention services to around 160 million GT of owned tonnage and 90 million GT of chartered tonnage, with around 3500 ships worldwide. Through its guaranteed subsidiary Sunderland Marine, North is also an insurer of fishing vessels, small craft and aquaculture risks. The P&I Club is a leading member of the International Group of P&I Clubs, with 11.5% of the group's owned tonnage. It employs almost 500 people worldwide. 

The North P&I Club was founded in 1860 and headquartered in Newcastle-upon-Tyne, UK with regional offices in Greece, China (Shanghai and Hong Kong), Japan, Singapore, Ireland and the United States. The Standard P&I Club was fully known as the Standard Steamship Owners Protection & Indemnity Association and was founded in 1884.

North P&I History 
North P&I Club started with the North of England Iron Steam Ship Protecting Association in Newcastle upon Tyne.  It had formed from a series of amalgamations in 1860. It was one of the world's first mutual associations providing personal injury and collision liability cover for steamships. In 1885 North P&I Club added cargo indemnity cover by merging with the local Steam Ship Owners’ Mutual and, by 1914, had become the leading P&I club in Britain.

North P&I Club lost business after World War II with the decline of the British merchant navy. A gradual revival began in the 1960s with the appointment of managers Alec Murray and Len Harrison.  North P&I Club became a member of the London Group of protecting and indemnity (P&I) clubs in 1969, which later became the International Group. North P&I Club opened branch offices in Hong Kong in 1995, Greece in 2000, Singapore in 2007 and Japan in 2012.

The tradition of two managing directors, which first started in 1885, continued with the appointment of the joint management team of Peter Crichton and Rodney Eccleston in 1988 and by their successors Alan Wilson and Paul Jennings in 2009.

Corporate development 
Much of the P&I Club growth since the 1960s has been due to mergers and acquisitions of smaller clubs. In 1967 North P&I Club absorbed the neighbouring Neptune P&I club, bringing a number of Irish and Yugoslav vessels. On 20 February 1998 it merged with the Newcastle club, adding some 5 million GT of shipping and 30 staff. Two years later North P&I Club absorbed the business of the Liverpool and London club, adding another 5 million GT.

In 2000 North P&I Club also established North Insurance Management Limited (NIML), a wholly owned management subsidiary.

Sunderland Marine and the North Group
On 28 February 2014 North P&I Club acquired Sunderland Marine Mutual Insurance Company Limited, a leading insurer of fishing vessels, small craft and aquaculture risks.

Established in 1882 in Sunderland, Sunderland Marine is now based in Newcastle-upon-Tyne following the 2014 merger with global marine mutual insurer North. North is authorised by the UK's Prudential Regulation Authority and regulated by the Financial Conduct Authority and the Prudential Regulation Authority. Together, North Group has offices and subsidiaries in Australia and New Zealand, Hong Kong and Shanghai, Greece, Ireland, Japan, Singapore, and United States, and has a S&P Global ‘A’ rating.

North and Sunderland Marine's business in the EEA is underwritten by North of England P&I Designated Activity Company, a wholly owned subsidiary of North incorporated in Ireland and regulated by the Central Bank of Ireland.

Products and services

P&I
The P&I Club's primary business is providing P&I cover to shipowners and charterers worldwide. The insurance is comprehensive and includes cover for third party legal liabilities in respect of:

 People claims
 Collisions
 Damage to fixed and floating objects
 Pollution
 Wreck removal
 Cargo claims
 Fines or other penalties.

The P&I Club operates comprehensive pre-employment medical schemes in the Philippines and Ukraine. It has also developed a ‘First Call’ service for crew landed and requiring treatment in the US, and a post-repatriation medical scheme specifically for Filipino crewmembers.

FD&D
The P&I Club provides freight, demurrage and defence insurance (FD&D) that protects members’ interests and assets by supporting them to recover any proper claims for uninsured losses and/or to defend and resist any actions improperly brought against them, that fall within the remit of the club's rules.

It covers legal costs and expenses properly incurred in all types of dispute falling outside the scope of P&I, hull and machinery, loss of hire and time charterers’ liability for damage to hull insurances. Most of the disputes referred to the FD&D team are charter party disputes, but it also handles a large number of queries and claims concerning:

 Bills of lading
 Guarantees and letters of indemnity 
 Sale and purchase contracts
 Newbuilding contracts
 Bunker (and other) suppliers
 Stevedores
 Underwriters
 Crew 
 Other matters connected to contracts of affreightment and carriage.

War risks
The P&I Club's war risks class provides cover for losses caused by war or terrorism in respect of physical loss or damage to the entered ship, P&I liabilities and losses incurred as a consequence of an entered ship being blocked or trapped in an area of conflict.

Ancillary cover
The P&I Club provides bespoke additional cover for owners, charterers and non-vessel-owning common carriers for operations which go outside standard P&I risks or which involve specialised marine operations.

 Cargo risks - ship owner's liabilities (SOL), contractual deviations, ad valorem bills of lading, mis-delivery under bills of lading, rare and valuable cargo, non-poolable paperless trading, cargo owner's liabilities, and extended through-transport cover for cargo.
 People risks - crew familiarization and newbuilding supervisors.
 Contractual liabilities - excess contractual cover and North America clean-up.
 Commercial risks - maritime lien for charterers' debts, maritime lien for second-hand ships, ship seizure, charterer's loss of use, balance sheet protection in fluctuating chartering markets, and balance sheet protection for owners with newbuildings on order.
 Specialist risks - offshore oil and gas exploration and productions operations, specialist operations, dredging, pile-driving, cable-laying, non-poolable towage, divers, salvage, and heavy-lift operations.

Loss prevention
The P&I Club's loss prevention service provides Members with information upon which they can base their own loss prevention and safety programmes. It includes practical loss prevention guides, briefings and other publications produced specifically for members, together with topical information, training and other loss prevention tools.

North Hull
The Club also provides comprehensive cover for Hull and Machinery, plus associated lines of insurance from its London office. Hull and Machinery (H&M) insurance protects the vessel itself. There are a number of sub-classes under the H&M banner, such as Increased Value (IV), Loss of Hire and War.

References

External links 
North P&I Club

Financial services companies established in 1860
Insurance companies of the United Kingdom
P&I clubs
Companies based in Newcastle upon Tyne